Antoinette Bower is a British-American retired film, television and stage actress, whose career lasted nearly four decades.

Early years
Bower was born in Baden-Baden to a German mother and an English father. She lived in England, Vienna and Monte Carlo and was educated in England. She moved to Canada in 1953.

Career
Bower has many television guest roles to her credit – between 1958 and 1987, she amassed over 90 appearances on such programs as Ben Casey, The Fugitive, Combat!, Twelve O'Clock High, The Invaders, Mannix, Mission: Impossible (in 4 episodes), Perry Mason, The Big Valley, The Six Million Dollar Man, Kojak, Star Trek, Hogan's Heroes (in 3 different roles), Cannon, Columbo, Hawaii Five-O, The Twilight Zone and Murder, She Wrote.

In the 1970s and 1980s she appeared in the movies A Death of Innocence (1971), Die Sister, Die! (1972, released in 1978), Prom Night (1980), The Cowboy and the Ballerina (1984), The Evil That Men Do (1984) and Club Paradise (1986).

She played in three episodes between 1967 and 1969 of Hogan's Heroes as an underground agent in Germany. She also co-starred with Christopher Plummer and Jean Simmons in the TV mini-series The Thorn Birds (1983) and, from 1989 to 1992, was a regular on the Canadian TV series Neon Rider.

In 1979, Bower co-starred in four episodes of Mutual Radio Theater.

Personal life
Bower was married to James Francis Gill.

Selected TV and filmography

TV Series - Guest Appearances

TV Series - Regular Appearances

Neon Rider (42 episodes, 1989–92)

TV Movie Appearances

 The Scorpio Letters (1967)
The Sunshine Patriot (1968)
See The Man Run (1971) 
A Death of Innocence (1971)
First, You Cry (1978)
The Cowboy and the Ballerina (1984)

Film Appearances

Mutiny on the Bounty (1962 - uncredited) 
The Mephisto Waltz (1971 - uncredited) 
Superbeast (1972)
Die Sister, Die! (1972 - not released until 1978)
Prom Night (1980) 
Blood Song (1982)
Time Walker (1982) 
The Evil That Men Do (1984) 
Club Paradise (1986)

References

External links
 

Living people
American television actresses
American film actresses
German emigrants to the United States
People from Baden-Baden
20th-century American actresses
21st-century American women
Year of birth missing (living people)